José Oswaldo Ramos Soto (born 25 February 1947 in La Ceiba, Atlántida.) Son of: Alba Luz Soto and José A. Ramos. Is a Honduran lawyer and politician, currently is a member of the National Congress of Honduras representing the National Party of Honduras for the department of Francisco Morazán

Ramos was nominated as presidential candidate in the 1993 elections, defeating Nora Gúnera de Melgar in primary elections of the National Party of Honduras in 1993; general elections won by the candidate of the Liberal Party of Honduras, Carlos Roberto Reina.

Ramos Soto he has been President of the National Autonomous University of Honduras. He also was president of the Honduran Lawyers Bar Association, Dean of the Honduran National University and Chief Justice of the Supreme Court of Honduras.

References

1947 births
Living people
20th-century Honduran lawyers
Deputies of the National Congress of Honduras
National Party of Honduras politicians
Candidates for President of Honduras
Presidents of the Supreme Court of Honduras
People from Tegucigalpa
21st-century Honduran lawyers